Peter B. Shalen (born c. 1946) is an American mathematician, working primarily in low-dimensional topology.  He is the "S" in JSJ decomposition.

Life
He graduated from Stuyvesant High School in 1962, and went on to earn a B.A. from Harvard College in 1966 and his Ph.D. from Harvard University in 1972.  After posts at Columbia University, Rice University, and the Courant Institute, he joined the faculty of the University of Illinois at Chicago.

Shalen was a Sloan Foundation Research Fellow in mathematics (1977—1979). In 1986 he was an invited speaker at the International Congress of Mathematicians in Berkeley, California. He was elected as a member of the 2017 class of Fellows of the American Mathematical Society "for contributions to three-dimensional topology and for exposition".

Work
His work with Marc Culler related properties of  representation varieties of hyperbolic 3-manifold groups to decompositions of 3-manifolds.  Based on this work, Culler, Cameron Gordon, John Luecke, and Shalen proved the cyclic surgery theorem.  An important corollary of the theorem is that at most one nontrivial Dehn surgery (+1 or −1) on a knot can result in a simply-connected 3-manifold.   This was an important piece of the Gordon–Luecke theorem that knots are determined by their complements.  This paper is often referred to as "CGLS".

With John W. Morgan, he generalized his work with Culler, and reproved several foundational results of William Thurston.

Selected publications

Shalen, Peter B. Separating, incompressible surfaces in 3-manifolds. Inventiones Mathematicae 52 (1979), no. 2, 105–126.
 Culler, Marc; Shalen, Peter B. Varieties of group representations and splittings of 3-manifolds. Annals of Mathematics (2) 117 (1983), no. 1, 109–146.
 Culler, Marc; Gordon, C. McA.; Luecke, J.; Shalen, Peter B. Dehn surgery on knots.  Annals of Mathematics (2)  125  (1987),  no. 2, 237–300.
 Morgan, John W.; Shalen, Peter B. Valuations, trees, and degenerations of hyperbolic structures. I. Ann. of Math. (2) 120 (1984), no. 3, 401–476.
 Morgan, John W.; Shalen, Peter B. Degenerations of hyperbolic structures. II. Measured laminations in 3-manifolds. Annals of Mathematics (2)  127  (1988),  no. 2, 403–456.
 Morgan, John W.; Shalen, Peter B. Degenerations of hyperbolic structures. III. Actions of 3-manifold groups on trees and Thurston's compactness theorem. Annals of Mathematics (2)  127  (1988),  no. 3, 457–519.

References

External links
Shalen's home page at UIC
Art Rothstein's Stuyvesant Math Team page

1940s births
20th-century American mathematicians
21st-century American mathematicians
Topologists
Stuyvesant High School alumni
Harvard College alumni
Columbia University faculty
Rice University faculty
University of Illinois Chicago faculty
Living people
Courant Institute of Mathematical Sciences faculty
Fellows of the American Mathematical Society
Mathematicians from New York (state)